College English is an official publication of the American National Council of Teachers of English and is aimed at college-level teachers and scholars of English. The peer-reviewed journal publishes articles on a range of topics related to the teaching of English language arts at the college level, including literature, rhetoric, critical theory, and pedagogy. It sometimes publishes special issues devoted to specific themes. Its content is accessible electronically via ERIC, ProQuest, and JSTOR, and is indexed by the MLA.

History
College English began in 1939 when it was spun off from The English Journal. Its first editor was W. Wilbur Hatfield, who also edited The English Journal. He continued to edit both publications until 1955.

Editors
Since its founding in 1939, College English has had eleven editors:

 W. Wilbur Hatfield (1939–1955)
 Frederick L. Gwynn (1955–1960)
 James E. Miller, Jr. (1960–1966)
 Richard Ohmann (1966–1978)
 Donald Gray (1978–1985)
 James C. Raymond (1985–1992)
 Louise Z. Smith (1992–1999)
 Jeanne Gunner (1999–2006)
 John Schilb (2006–2012)
 Kelly Ritter (2012–2017)
 Melissa Ianetta (2017–2022)
 Lori Ostergaard (2022–present)

References

External links

Literary magazines published in the United States
Language education journals
English-language education
Publications established in 1939
1939 establishments in the United States
Writing